Louis Charles Jean Courajod (22 February 1841 – 26 June 1896) was a French art historian,  museum curator and connoisseur-collector, who was born and died in Paris.

Biography
Courajod was trained as a lawyer, then as an historian at the École Nationale des Chartes (1864–67), then served an apprenticeship at the Cabinet des estampes of the Bibliothèque Nationale, under chief curator Henri Delaborde, while he pursued his studies at the École Pratique des Hautes Études. His first publication (1867) was an article on the Plantagenet tombs at Fontevrault

In 1874 he began his career at the Musée du Louvre, developing at first his special interest in the Gothic sculpture of the 14th and 15th centuries, then turning to the art franc, of the Carolingians. In 1887, he was appointed a professor at the École du Louvre, teaching Medieval and Renaissance sculpture; he was director of the department from 1893.

Courajod was a regular contributor to the Gazette des Beaux-Arts. He served on the Commission des monuments historiques and was a member of the Société des Antiquaires de France.

Courajod introduced the term "International Gothic" to describe the Late Gothic movement expressed in sculptures and other media.

A commemorative memoir, Louis Courajod, un historien de l'art français, was published by Courajod's former pupil, Albert Marignan, in 1896.

Further reading 
 Laura Morowitz, "Une Guerre sainte contre l'académisme: Louis Courajod, the Louvre, and the Barbaric Middle Ages", in: The Year's Work in Medievalism #15 (2002), Jesse Swan and Richard Utz (Eds.)

Notes

External links

 



French art historians
People associated with the Louvre
Writers from Paris
1841 births
1896 deaths
École Nationale des Chartes alumni
French male non-fiction writers